Have You Fed the Fish? is an album released by Badly Drawn Boy (born Damon Gough) in 2002. The album's title originates from the question which Gough asks his daughter each day "to the point where it got to sound like one of those words you say too many times and it sounds silly."

Also included with the album's release was a competition. Placed within certain copies of the album, the "5 Golden Fish" would win the owner a song writing session with Gough. However, the prizes remain unclaimed. The fish, it seems, have remained hidden.

In 2003 Damon presented the Manchester 24 photographic gallery with a picture of his children's goldfish after being asked to take photos of his life during a 24-hour period.
"It's either me or my girlfriend or my daughter. I let her feed them but she tends to overfeed them which can kill them and if you don't feed them enough that can kill them, so it's real poignant subject. You've got to be careful with fish."

Have You Fed The Fish? contained Badly Drawn Boy's highest charting single "You Were Right", which received heavy airplay on BBC Radio 2 and got to number 9 in the charts—his only top ten single. "You Were Right" also earned him a performance on BBC Television's Top of the Pops.

Cover art
The album art and sleeves feature some famous names.
Lady on front cover: Jane Birkin; her daughter Charlotte Gainsbourg sings on the album.
Man on reverse with mustache: a Groucho Marx puppet.
Inside pages: Damon's girlfriend Clare, and their children Eddie and Oscar.
On the boat in the inside pages: Damon Gough; Anna of Misty Dixon fame; DJ and artist Andy Votel; Jane Weaver, also from Misty Dixon; Dave Tyack.

The photo of Damon alongside the album credits was taken in his house.

Track listing
All tracks written by Damon Michael Gough
"Coming in to Land" – 1:37
Synth, Piano, Guitars & Percussion – Badly Drawn Boy
Drums – Joey Waronker
Bass – Sasha Kristov
Strings Arranged & Conducted by Matt Dunkley
"Have You Fed the Fish?" – 4:18
Synth, Piano, Guitars & Vocals – Badly Drawn Boy
Drums – Joey Waronker
Bass – Sasha Kristov
Additional Guitar – John "Gumby" Goodwin
"Born Again" – 4:40
Guitars, Piano & Vocals – Badly Drawn Boy
Drums – Joey Waronker
Bass – Sasha Kristov
Additional Guitar – John "Gumby" Goodwin
Background Vocals – Sharon Celani, Gia Ciambotti, Drew Arrison & Gemma Gough
"40 Days, 40 Fights" – 3:55
Piano, Guitars, Tambourine & Vocals – Badly Drawn Boy
Drums – Danny Heifetz
Bass – Sasha Kristov
Background Vocals – Sharon Celani, Gia Ciambotti
Shaker – Tom Rothrock
"All Possibilities" – 3:54
Guitars, Piano, Tambourine & Vocals – Badly Drawn Boy
Drums – Danny Heifetz
Bass – Sasha Kristov
Horns – Probyn Gregory
Synth – Tom Rothrock
Strings Arranged & Conducted by Matt Dunkley
"I Was Wrong" – 1:10
"You Were Right" – 4:52
Guitars, Piano, Synth & Vocals – Badly Drawn Boy
Drums – Joey Waronker
Bass – Sasha Kristov
Steel Guitar – John "Gumby" Goodwin
Strings Arranged & Conducted by Matt Dunkley
"Centrepeace" – 1:49
Strings Arranged & Conducted by Matt Dunkley
"How?" – 5:17
Guitars, Piano & Vocals – Badly Drawn Boy
Drums – Danny Heifetz
Bass, Chamberlain Strings, Fuzz Guitar, Electric Guitar – Jon Brion
Strings Arranged & Conducted by Matt Dunkley & Jon Brion
Horns – Probyn Gregory
"The Further I Slide" – 3:47
Guitars, Clavier, Flute & Vocals – Badly Drawn Boy
Drums, Percussion – Pete Thomas
Bass – Sasha Kristov
Background Vocals – Sharon Celani, Gia Ciambotti
Horns – Probyn Gregory
Casio Solo, Chamberlin – Jon Brion
"Imaginary Lines" – 0:45
Guitars & Vocals – Badly Drawn Boy
Drums – Joey Waronker
Bass – Sasha Kristov
"Using Our Feet" – 4:10
Guitars, Piano & Vocals – Badly Drawn Boy
Drums, Percussion – Joey Waronker
Drum Programming – Tom Rothrock
Bass – Sasha Kristov
Background Vocals – Sharon Celani & Gia Ciambotti
Chorus Background Vocals – Charlotte Gainsbourg
"Tickets to What You Need" – 2:48
Piano, Guitars, Synth, Chamberlain Strings & Vocals – Badly Drawn Boy
Drums – Joey Waronker
Bass – Sasha Kristov
Slide Guitar – John "Gumby" Goodwin
"What Is It Now?" – 2:42
Guitars, Piano & Vocals – Badly Drawn Boy
Drums, Percussion – Pete Thomas
Bass – Sasha Kristov
Horns – Danny Heifetz
Background Vocals – Charlotte Gainsbourg
"Bedside Story" – 4:53
Piano, Guitars, Synth & Vocals – Badly Drawn Boy
Drum Programming & Skateboard – Tom Rothrock
Drums – Danny Heifetz
Bass – Sasha Kristov
Strings Arranged & Conducted by Matt Dunkley
Background Vocals – Clare Hewitt

Personnel
Badly Drawn Boy – guitars, vocals, piano, synthesizer, tambourine, Clavier, percussion, flute, Chamberlain strings
Joey Waronker – drums, percussion
Sasha Kristov – bass
Matt Dunkley – string arrangement and conducting
John "Gumby" Goodwin – additional guitar, slide guitar, steel guitar
Sharon Celani – backing vocals
Gia Ciambotti – backing vocals
Drew Arrison – backing vocals
Gemma Gough – backing vocals
Danny Heifetz – drums, horns
Tom Rothrock – drum programming, synthesizer, shaker, skateboard
Probyn Gregory – horns
Jon Brion – electric guitar, fuzz guitar, bass, Casio solo, Chamberlin, Chamberlain strings, string arrangement and conducting
Pete Thomas – drums, percussion
Charlotte Gainsbourg – backing vocals, chorus backing vocals
Clare Hewitt – backing vocals

References

Badly Drawn Boy albums
2002 albums
XL Recordings albums
Albums produced by Tom Rothrock